Notomulciber notatus is a species of beetle in the family Cerambycidae. It was described by Fisher in 1936, originally under the genus Micromulciber. It is known from Java.

References

Homonoeini
Beetles described in 1936